Youngblood Hawke is an American indie pop band based in Los Angeles, California.

History
Both Simon Katz and Sam Martin were in the band Iglu & Hartly, but after a 2011 hiatus, the two reformed with three of their long-time friends to form Youngblood Hawke. Their name is taken from the Herman Wouk novel of the same name. In October 2011, before landing a recording contract with Universal Republic, Youngblood had a residency at The Satellite in Los Angeles. Aside from that, the group has performed at South by Southwest, playing showcases such as  Comedy Central Workaholics showcase, and Purevolume House.

The band was based in Silverlake, Los Angeles, where they were working on their debut album and worked odd jobs on the side during the recording process. Youngblood Hawke's first single "We Come Running", was described by LA Weeklys Kevin Bronson as showing the quintet's "skills at grabbing hold of the pop jugular vein". Their track "Forever" was the Starbucks Pick of the Week for September 2012. Before that, they joined the line-up for both the Echo Park Rising Festival as well as Lobsterfest. "We Come Running" was also featured on the soundtrack for the association football video game FIFA 13. "We Come Running" was also used in the first episode of The 100. In 2014, another song from their debut album, "Stars", was featured in a commercial for the streaming service Netflix.

Youngblood Hawke's video for their debut single "We Come Running" was featured on Rolling Stone, "where they play music and scuba dive with sharks in time" in hopes to help promote the conservation of sharks.

The band is currently in the process of recording their second studio album and its lead single  "Pressure" was released in early 2014. They "plan on releasing a cover song accompanied by a band-made music video every month until the album is released," starting with Private Eyes by Hall & Oates which was released on March 2, 2015.

The band's song "Knock Me Down" was released on July 30, 2015 as the second single from the band's forthcoming second album. A lyric video for the song was released on May 30, 2017, nearly two years after its initial release. Meanwhile, the song was featured in a commercial for PlayStation 4 and also in the UFC documentary Road to the Octagon. The song was later used in an Applebee's commercial and was also featured in the soundtrack for Madden NFL 16.

The band's song "Robbers" was released on June 15, 2017. Another single called "Trust", co-written and co-produced by Andrew Taggart of The Chainsmokers,  was released on February 9, 2018.

On July 28, 2020, the band announced their second full-length album Edge of the World, which is set to be released on October 9, 2020. The album's lead single "Waking Up the World" was released on August 6th via the band's SoundCloud channel, one day prior to the song's scheduled release date. The album's second single called "Criminals" was released on August 28, followed by "Find a Way" as the album's third and final single on September 18.

Buzz Bands LA touched on the band's extended hiatus, writing "[the band] has been in the background, ensconced in things like day jobs, solo projects, musical collaborations and impending parenthood."

In 2021 Sam Martin released a solo single called "Patience" under the name Sunshine Boysclub.

Discography

Studio albums

Extended plays

Singles

Featured singles

Other appearances

References

Indie rock musical groups from California
Musical groups from Los Angeles
Universal Records artists
Republic Records artists